is a former Japanese football player. He played for Japan national team. He currently manager of Kamatamare Sanuki from 2023.

Club career
Yoneyama was born in Utsunomiya on November 20, 1976. When he was a Komazawa University student, he joined Verdy Kawasaki (later Tokyo Verdy) in 1998. He became a regular player as center-back among the teams where generations change. In 2004, the club won the champions J.League Cup. However, the club was relegated to J2 League in 2005. He moved to Kawasaki Frontale in 2006. However, there were few opportunities to play, so he moved to Nagoya Grampus Eight (later Nagoya Grampus) in 2007. In 2009, he moved to his local club Tochigi SC in J2 League. He left the club end of 2010 season and announced his retirement in November 2011.

Managerial career
In 2012, Yoneyama signed to Tokyo 23 FC as manager

In 22 November 2022, he joined to J3 club, Kamatamare Sanuki as manager replaced by Toshihiro Nishimura for 2023 season.

National team career
In February 2000, Yoneyama was selected Japan national team for 2000 Asian Cup qualification. At this qualification, on February 16 he debuted against Brunei.

Club statistics

Managerial statistics
.

National team statistics

References

External links
 
 Japan National Football Team Database
 

1976 births
Living people
Komazawa University alumni
Association football people from Tochigi Prefecture
Japanese footballers
Japan international footballers
J1 League players
J2 League players
Tokyo Verdy players
Kawasaki Frontale players
Nagoya Grampus players
Tochigi SC players
Association football defenders
J3 League managers
Kamatamare Sanuki managers